Arthur Storey and the Department of Historical Correction is believed to be BBC radio's first truly interactive radio drama, broadcast live during BBC7’s Big Toe Radio Show between 14 November and 18 November 2005. The series incorporated characters and plot suggestions phoned, texted, faxed and e-mailed by young listeners.

With the exception of the first episode, which established the main characters and the Department of Historical Correction (founded to return historical characters appearing in the present through temporal rifts to ‘their right time and place’), each episode was written in a hotel room overnight by author Philip Ardagh, incorporating as many of the listeners’ ideas as was feasible. The script was then discussed between Ardagh, producer Nicky Grishotti and director Paul Arnold the following morning, in time for any rewrites and tweaks before the actors arrived for a mid-morning run-through.

These episodes were then performed live in the Big Toe studio—including the music—after which Ardagh took calls and comments from listeners. Each episode was then replayed near the conclusion of each show to encourage further ideas. As the week progressed, more and more of the show was given over to listener feedback live on air.

The idea of an interactive show of this type was Paul Arnold's and he and Nicky Grishoti came up with the title ‘Arfur Story’ the idea being that the listener had to ‘provide the other arf’. Ardagh added flesh to the bones by creating The Department of Historical Correction, the idea being that familiar characters could be easily introduced without the need for ‘back story’. (“Everyone knows who Florence Nightingale is, so once her name is suggested, she can become a part of the action.”) He also tweaked the hero's name to Arthur Storey.

Though questioning whether memorable drama could be made by committee, Paul Donovan of The Sunday Times described Arthur Storey as "a live daily serial about time travel, based on fantastical suggestions (“Mary, Queen of Scots hits Albert Einstein over the head with a frying pan”) sent in by Big Toe's core audience of 8- to 12-year-olds and hammered into shape by the children's author Philip Ardagh. ... The truly original feature of BBC7's serial was that its listeners, not the professional writer, determined both the fate of the characters and the outcome. It was all utter nonsense, like a game of consequences, fun and fast ..."

Cast
Narrator: Philip Ardagh
Arthur Storey: Pax Bauldwin
Edna Bucket: Elisha Mansuroglu
All other male roles: Toby Longworth
All other female roles: Rachael Atkins
Writer: Philip Ardagh (with audience input)
Music: Tim Wolf
Director: Paul Arnold
Producer: Nicky Grishotti
Executive Producer: Chris Wilson
Big Toe Editor:

BBC Radio 4 Extra programmes
British radio dramas